Kruglitsa is a rural locality (a village) in Spasskoye Rural Settlement, Vologodsky District, Vologda Oblast, Russia. The population was 7 in 2002.

Geography 
The distance to Vologda is 46.6 km, to Nepotyagovo is 32 km. Nikitino, Pochinok, Ilyinskoye, Krugolka, Norobovo is the nearest rural locality.

References 

Rural localities in Vologodsky District